Yamal Airlines (Russian: ОАО "Авиационная транспортная компания "Ямал", OAO Aviacionnaja transportnaja kompania "Yamal") is an airline based in Salekhard, Yamalo-Nenets Autonomous Okrug, Russia. It operates regional passenger services and was established in 1997.

Destinations
Yamal Airlines serves the following destinations:

Codeshare Agreements 
S7 Airlines

Fleet
As of July 2022 the Yamal Airlines fleet comprises the following aircraft:

References

External links

Yamal Airlines 

Airlines of Russia
Airlines banned in the European Union
Companies based in Salekhard
Airlines established in 1997